Marsainvilliers is a commune in the Loiret department in north-central France. The poet Micheline Dupray was born in Marsainvilliers in 1929.

The name of inhabitants are Marsainvilloises

See also
Communes of the Loiret department

References

Communes of Loiret